HMS Medway was a 60-gun fourth rate ship of the line of the Royal Navy, launched at Sheerness Dockyard on 20 September 1693.

Medway, together with Chatham and Triton, captured the French Auguste on 19 August 1705.

She was rebuilt according to the 1706 Establishment at Deptford Dockyard, and relaunched on 1 August 1718. Medway was hulked in 1740.

She was eventually broken up in 1749.

Notes

References

Lavery, Brian (2003) The Ship of the Line - Volume 1: The development of the battlefleet 1650-1850. Conway Maritime Press. .
Roche, Jean-Michel (2005) Dictionnaire des Bâtiments de la Flotte de Guerre Française de Colbert à nos Jours. (Group Retozel-Maury Millau), Vol. 1.

Ships of the line of the Royal Navy
1690s ships